= The Voice of Stray Dogs =

The Voice of Stray Dogs is a privately run rescue service, treatment centre and dog sanctuary for stray dogs, situated in Bengaluru. The organisation offers a CRM based contact, retrieval and tracking system and advanced veterinary care free of cost to stray dogs of Bengaluru. It also runs dog birth control clinics.

The organisation is credited to have created the world's first mobile phone application for reporting and following up on stray dogs in distress.
